Bernard Kleiman (1928-2006) was an American lawyer.

Early life 
Although born in Chicago, Bernard Kleiman grew up in Kendallville, Indiana, where his father was a scrap metal dealer.  He played center on the varsity basketball team in high school, and graduated in 1944.

He delayed his acceptance to Purdue University to enlist in the Army. He toured with the Army basketball team and served in Korea. His military service was cut short by scarlet fever. He returned to Purdue and graduated in 1951, having majored in metallurgical engineering. He then attended the Northwestern University School of Law, from which he graduated in 1954.

Legal career 
In 1960, Kleiman became counsel for District 31 of the United Steelworkers Union, covering Illinois and Indiana. He spearheaded a successful lawsuit that forced Illinois to reapportion its legislature to assure it followed the principle of one person one vote.

Impressed by Mr. Kleiman's accomplishments, I. W. Abel, the union's president, named him the union's general counsel in 1965. As general counsel Mr. Kleiman often served as the union's chief negotiator, helping make the nation's steelworkers some of the highest-paid blue-collar workers in the world.
During his tenure as general counsel, Kleiman negotiated a 1973 agreement that barred strikes in the steel industry for a decade. The agreement was designed to curb steel imports, because six months before every contract deadline, the nation's automakers and other steel users began greatly increasing their purchases from abroad.

Kleiman negotiated contracts that helped keep several steel companies afloat during the 1980s, when the industry was traumatized by recession and surging imports. He also helped negotiate an affirmative action agreement for the steel and aluminum industries, paving the way to hire more minority workers. The aluminum agreement was upheld in a landmark Supreme Court case, United Steelworkers v. Weber.

He negotiated with many leading companies, including United States Steel, Kaiser Aluminum, Bethlehem Steel, Goodyear and Bridgestone Firestone.

Leo W. Gerard, the USWA's president, was quoted as saying that “It is difficult to overstate his impact on the union....His role with the union was much broader then the typical duties of general counsel.”

In the 1980s, Mr. Kleiman negotiated deals with two companies that were close to bankruptcy, the Wheeling-Pittsburgh Steel Corporation and the Allegheny Ludlum Corporation, allowing them to pay smaller compensation packages than steelmakers in better financial shape. When the industry rebounded in the late 1980s, Mr. Kleiman spearheaded efforts to restore a pattern in which all steelmakers provided similar wages and benefits.

Mr. Kleiman stepped down from the general counsel's position in 1997, but remained special counsel to the union's president. He officially retired in the summer of 2006, but continued working, most recently in the union's two-month-old strike against Goodyear.

Civil Rights Activities 
Mr. Kleiman was instrumental in bringing the Civil Rights Act to the steel industry in 1974, when a federal judge issued a consent decree establishing goals for hiring women and minority workers and promoting them.  This opened U.S. steel mills jobs to both blacks and women.

References 

 
 
 

Illinois lawyers
United Steelworkers people
1928 births
2006 deaths
Purdue University College of Engineering alumni
Northwestern University Pritzker School of Law alumni
20th-century American lawyers